North American cold wave may refer to:

1936 North American cold wave
1985 North American cold wave
1994 North American cold wave
Early 2014 North American cold wave
November 2014 North American cold wave
February 2015 North American cold wave
December 2017–January 2018 North American cold wave
January–February 2019 North American cold wave
February 2021 North American cold wave